In Electrical systems, such as telecommunication, power electronics, industrial electronics, power engineering; electromagnetic interference (EMI) control  is the control of radiated and conducted energy such that emissions that are unnecessary for system, subsystem, or equipment operation are reduced, minimized, or eliminated. 

Note:  Electromagnetic radiated and conducted emissions are controlled regardless of their origin within the system, subsystem, or equipment. Successful EMI control with effective susceptibility control leads to electromagnetic compatibility.

References

See also 
 Radio resource management

Interference